Dynamo Stadium is a multi-purpose stadium. It is situated in Makhachkala, Russia.  It is currently used mostly for football matches and is the home ground of FC Dynamo Makhachkala.  The stadium holds 15,200 people and opened in 1927. It hosted Russian Premier League side Anzhi Makhachkala until they moved to the Anzhi-Arena in 2013.

External links
Stadium Guide Profile

Football venues in Russia
Sport in Makhachkala
Dynamo sports society
FC Anzhi Makhachkala
Multi-purpose stadiums in Russia
Buildings and structures in Dagestan